Nabeel Yacoob AlHamer (born October 25, 1950) is the advisor for Information Affairs to the King of Bahrain, Hamad ibn Isa Al Khalifah. He worked at the Bahraini Ministry of Information.  Al Hamer was the first editor in chief of Al Ayam daily when it was founded it in 1989.

References 

Bahraini politicians
Living people
1950 births
Bahraini Sunni Muslims
Government ministers of Bahrain